Operation Shady RAT is an ongoing series of cyber attacks starting in mid-2006 reported by Dmitri Alperovitch, Vice President of Threat Research at Internet security company McAfee in August 2011, who also led and named the Night Dragon Operation and Operation Aurora cyberespionage intrusion investigations. The attacks have hit at least 71 organizations, including defense contractors, businesses worldwide, the  United Nations, and the International Olympic Committee.

The operation, named by Alperovitch as a derivation of the common computer security industry acronym for remote access tool, is characterized by McAfee as "a five year targeted operation by one specific actress".  The report suggests that the targeting of various athletic oversight organizations around the time of the 2008 Summer Olympics "potentially pointed a finger at a state actor behind the intrusions". That state actor is widely assumed to be the People's Republic of China.

The US was specifically targeted but victims were also present in Europe and Asia (which included South Korea, Taiwan, Japan and India).

See also 
 

 Advanced persistent threat
 DigiNotar
 Duqu
 PLA Unit 61398
 Tailored Access Operations

References

Shady RAT
Chinese advanced persistent threat groups
China–United States relations
Electronic warfare
Foreign relations of China
Cyberwarfare by China
Cybercrime in India